The Biblioteca Nacional de Venezuela (in English: National Library of Venezuela), located in Caracas, is the legal deposit and copyright for Venezuela. It was established on July 13, 1833, by decree of General José Antonio Páez. Diego Bautista Urbaneja, a Minister of Foreign Affairs, was designated as the first director.

The current headquarters of the library was designed by architect Tomás Sanabria from 1981 to 1989 in the style of Brutalist architecture, featuring a range of design elements and distinctive construction techniques.

The library contains several special collections:

 Automated Catalog
 Orientation and Reference
 CEDINBI (Library Information and Documentation Center)
 General Bibliographic Collection (CBG)
 Hemerographic Collection (CH)
 Collection of Official Publications (CPO)
 Old Documentary Collection (CDA)
 Arcaya Collection (CA)
 Sound and Cinema Collection and Flat Works Collection (CSCCOP).
According to their website, "The institution aspires to be an active organization in the generation of knowledge through the publication of various titles, printed or virtual, specialized or of collective interest, which are a contribution to the formation of a citizenry committed to building a better society."

History
In 1831 Interior Secretary Antonio Leocadio Guzmán proposed the idea of merging convent libraries and books that were previously scattered throughout the country. While the 1833 decree by then-president José Antonio Páez is the widely-accepted date of establishment, it wasn't until 1870 that a "solid base for the functioning of the [National Library] was established."

In 1874 president Antonio Guzmán Blanco mandated that the collections of the convent libraries were to be delivered to the Universidad Central de Venezuela. These collections would ultimately be added to the National Library, then located in the university campus.

The first printed catalog, the Catalog of the Library of the University of Caracas, was published in 1875 by Adolfo Ernst, a prominent scientist who would go on to become the director in 1876.

See also
 Literature of Venezuela
 List of national libraries

References

External links

Official site (in Spanish)

1833 establishments in Venezuela
Buildings and structures in Caracas
Deposit libraries
Libraries established in 1833
Libraries in Venezuela
Venezuela